Punkin Center can refer to some places in the United States:

 Punkin Center, Arizona
 Punkin Center, Colorado
 Haynesville, Texas, also known as Punkin Center

See also
Pumpkin Center (disambiguation)